Roger A. Picard (born January 26, 1957 in Woonsocket, Rhode Island) is an American politician and a Democratic member of the Rhode Island Senate representing District 20 since January 2009. Picard served consecutively in the Rhode Island General Assembly from January 1993 until January 2009 in the Rhode Island House of Representatives District 66 and 51 seats.

Education
Picard graduated from the University of Rhode Island and earned his MSW from Rhode Island College.

Elections
2012 Picard was unopposed for both the September 11, 2012 Democratic Primary, winning with 1,743 votes, and the November 6, 2012 General election, winning with 7,727 votes.
1992 When District 66 Democratic Representative Charles Gould left the Legislature and left the seat open, Picard won the September 15, 1992 Democratic Primary and won the three-way November 3, 1992 General election with 2,589 votes (70.8%) against Republican nominee Joseph Doucette and Independent Sharon Bailey.
1994 Picard was challenged in the September 13, 1994 Democratic Primary, but won, and won the November 8, 1994 General election with 1,842 votes (86.7%) against Independent candidate Michael Moniz.
1996 Picard was unopposed for the September 10, 1996 Democratic Primary and won the November 5, 1996 General election against Republican nominee Edward Doura.
1998 Picard was unopposed for both the September 15, 1998 Democratic Primary, winning with 192 votes and the November 3, 1998 General election, winning with 1,863 votes.
2000 Picard was unopposed for both the September 12, 2000 Democratic Primary, winning with 253 votes, and the November 7, 2000 General election, winning with 2,344 votes.
2002 Redistricted to District 51, and with incumbent Representative Peter Lewiss redistricted to District 37, Picard faced fellow incumbent Representative Ronald Munschy (who had been redistricted from District 65) in the September 10, 2002 Democratic Primary, winning with 755 votes (67.4%), and was unopposed for the November 5, 2002 General election, winning with 2,778 votes.
2004 Picard was unopposed for both the September 14, 2004 Democratic Primary, winning with 160 votes, and the November 2, 2004 General election, winning with 3,368 votes.
2006 Picard was unopposed for both the September 12, 2006 Democratic Primary, winning with 549 votes, and the November 7, 2006 General election, winning with 3,309 votes.
2008 When District 20 Democratic Senator Roger Badeau retired and left the seat open, Picard was unopposed for both the September 9, 2008 Democratic Primary, winning with 2,072 votes, and the November 4, 2008 General election, winning with 8,657 votes.
2010 Picard was challenged in the September 23, 2010 Democratic Primary, winning with 1,722 votes (67.2%) and won the six-way November 2, 2010 General election with 5,026 votes (64.1%) against Republican nominee Stephen Orsini.

References

External links
Official page at the Rhode Island General Assembly

Roger Picard at Ballotpedia
Roger A. Picard at the National Institute on Money in State Politics

1957 births
Living people
Democratic Party members of the Rhode Island House of Representatives
Politicians from Woonsocket, Rhode Island
Rhode Island College alumni
Democratic Party Rhode Island state senators
University of Rhode Island alumni
21st-century American politicians